The 1989–90 Northern Football League season was the 92nd in the history of Northern Football League, a football competition in England.

Division One

Division One featured 17 clubs which competed in the division last season, along with three new clubs, promoted from Division Two:
 Alnwick Town
 Consett
 Whickham

League table

Division Two

Division Two featured 17 clubs which competed in the division last season, along with three new clubs.
 Clubs relegated from Division One:
 Chester-le-Street Town
 Crook Town
 Plus:
 Hebburn, joined from the Wearside Football League

League table

References

External links
 Northern Football League official site

Northern Football League seasons
1989–90 in English football leagues